Fernando Prestes is a municipality in the state of São Paulo in Brazil. The population is 5,794 (2020 est.) in an area of 170 km². The elevation is 545 m.

References

Municipalities in São Paulo (state)